& (stylized with the character ⅋; sometimes written Ampersand) is an EP and the debut major-label recording by rock group The Moth & The Flame, released digitally on November 5, 2013, internationally.  It was produced by drummer/producer Joey Waronker (Beck, Atoms for Peace, R.E.M.) and mixed by Peter Katis (The National, Interpol).  All songs were written by The Moth & The Flame.  To promote the EP, the group toured Europe supporting Imagine Dragons during the fall and winter of 2013.

Radio
"Sorry" received airtime on BBC Radio 1, Xfm, KROQ, KCRW, and other taste-making stations.  It reached #1 on the KROQ Locals Only Playlist.  "Sorry" featured as BBC Radio 1's Zane Lowe's "Next Hype".

Music video
The "Sorry" music video premiered on mtvU on Friday, November 22, 2013.  It features actor Kirby Heyborne and depicts a family of mannequins facing an atomic bomb detonation.

Media use
Track "How We Woke Up" appears in Skinwalker Ranch (2013).
Track "Sorry" featured on NFL on CBS in November 2013.

Track listing

Release history

References

External links
 The Moth & The Flame official site

2013 EPs
Art rock EPs
The Moth & The Flame albums